Charles John Shaw-Mackenzie of Tordarroch, 7th of Newhall  (3 March 1899 – 2 August 1978) was a British Army officer, Scottish officer of arms and clan chief.

Shaw was the son of John Alexander Shaw-Mackenzie of Tordarroch, 6th of Newhall and Frances Yule. He was educated at Charterhouse School, before joining the British Army. He was commissioned into the Seaforth Highlanders in 1918 having attended the Royal Military College, Sandhurst. In 1924 he was appointed a Military Member of the Order of the British Empire. He was promoted to Captain in 1928. In 1934 he was appointed a Deputy Lieutenant for Ross and Cromarty. He fought in the Second World War, during which he was taken prisoner in the Battle of France in 1940; he was repatriated in September 1944. Shaw was Mentioned in Dispatches in 1945. He was awarded the Efficiency Decoration in 1948.

In November 1958 Shaw matriculated his arms in the Court of the Lord Lyon and in 1970 he was recognised by Lord Lyon King of Arms as the 21st Chief of Clan Shaw. He held the office of Falkland Pursuivant in 1966. He was a member of the Royal Company of Archers.

Shaw was a Fellow of the Royal Geographical Society and the Society of Antiquaries of Scotland.

References

1899 births
1978 deaths
British Army personnel of World War II
British World War II prisoners of war
Deputy Lieutenants of Ross and Cromarty
Fellows of the Royal Geographical Society
Fellows of the Society of Antiquaries of Scotland
Graduates of the Royal Military College, Sandhurst
Members of the Order of the British Empire
Members of the Royal Company of Archers
People educated at Charterhouse School
Seaforth Highlanders officers
Scottish clan chiefs
Scottish officers of arms